"Dove si vola" (meaning "Where we fly" in Italian) is the debut single by Marco Mengoni, an Italian singer who won the third season of Italian series of The X Factor in 2009. Mengoni performed the song for the first time during the semi-finals of the talent show, aired on 27 November 2009. It was written by Italian songwriters Bungaro and Saverio Grandi and it was produced by Luca Rustici.

The single debuted at number 1 in the Italian Singles Chart on 10 December 2009. No official video was made to accompany the song.

Background
The single was officially released by Sony Music as a digital download immediately after Mengoni was announced winner of the talent-show. It is also included in Mengoni's debut EP, Dove si vola.

Mengoni's mentor, Morgan, revealed that the song had been originally composed for Chiara Ranieri, another contestant in the third series of The X-Factor, but the song was reassigned to Mengoni, the eventual winner, after Chiara Ranieri was eliminated in an earlier round.

Track listing

Charts

Weekly charts

Year-end charts

References

2009 debut singles
Number-one singles in Italy
Italian-language songs
Marco Mengoni songs
X Factor (Italian TV series)
2009 songs